The 2010–11 Liberty Flames basketball team represented Liberty University during the 2010–11 NCAA Division I men's basketball season. The Flames, led by second year head coach Dale Layer, played their home games at the Vines Center and were members of the Big South Conference.

Previous season
The Flames finished the 2009–10 season 15–16, 10–8 in Big South play to finish in sixth place. They lost in the quarterfinals of the Big South tournament to Winthrop.

Departures

Roster

Schedule and results

|-
!colspan=12 style=|Regular season

|-
!colspan=12 style=| Big South tournament

References

Liberty Flames basketball seasons
Liberty
Liberty Fl
Liberty Fl